Go is the sixth studio album by Canadian country music group Doc Walker. It was released on September 8, 2009 by Open Road Recordings and includes the single "Coming Home."

Track listing

Chart performance

Singles 

2009 albums
Doc Walker albums
Open Road Recordings albums